Oventje (translated: little oven) is a small village in the Dutch province of North Brabant. The village is situated in the former municipality of Landerd. Oventje had 490 inhabitants in 2008. Since 2022 it has been part of the new municipality of Maashorst.

Oventje has a small primary school, which has been founded in 1928. 
Oventje has a corn windmill, named Sint Victor, a heritage monument. 

In 1925, Oventje was hit by a cyclone. A lamp post distorted by the cyclone, now a heritage monument, remembers that event.

Sources 
 nl: Oventje on plaatsengids, the dutch guide of localities

Populated places in North Brabant
Geography of Maashorst